Handle with Care is an album by the Kenny Clarke/Francy Boland Big Band featuring performances recorded in Germany in 1963 for the Atlantic label.

Reception

The AllMusic review by Ken Dryden stated: "Although pretty brief by CD standards at just 34 minutes 26 seconds, there's absolutely no filler in this highly recommended CD".

Track listing
All compositions by Francy Boland, except where indicated.
 "Long Note Blues (Here Is Cecco Beppe)" - 6:38
 "Get Out of Town" (Cole Porter) - 5:50
 "Sonor" (Kenny Clarke) - 3:11 	
 "Speedy Reeds" - 5:39
 "Old Stuff" - 4:37
 "Om Mani Padme Hum" - 8:30

Personnel 
Kenny Clarke - drums
Francy Boland - piano, arranger
Edmund Arnie, Benny Bailey, Jimmy Deuchar, Maffy Falay, Roger Guérin, Idrees Sulieman - trumpet
Keg Johnson, Erich Kleinschuster, Nat Peck, Åke Persson - trombone
Derek Humble - alto saxophone 
Carl Drevo, Billy Mitchell, Ronnie Scott - tenor saxophone 
Sahib Shihab - baritone saxophone, flute
Jimmy Woode - bass
Joe Harris - timpani
Fats Sadi - bongos

References 

1963 albums
Kenny Clarke/Francy Boland Big Band albums
Atlantic Records albums